Peter F. Hayes is professor emeritus of history at the Weinberg College of Arts and Sciences, Northwestern University, and chair of the Academic Committee of the United States Holocaust Memorial Museum.

Specializing in the Holocaust, genocide and the history of modern Germany, Hayes is the author or editor of 10 books, including Industry and Ideology: IG Farben in the Nazi Era (1987), a prize-winning study of the IG Farben corporation. He has been described as the leading scholar of the historiography of industry in Nazi Germany.

Early life and education
Hayes was born in the Boston area to an Irish Catholic family; when he and his three siblings were older, his mother worked as a secretary for Honeywell. After attending middle and high school in Framingham, MA, Hayes completed his AB in government in 1968 at Bowdoin College, Brunswick, Maine, where he was supervised by John Rensenbrink for his senior thesis on African politics.

He had intended to study law but instead became interested in history after winning a Keasbey Scholarship to Balliol College, Oxford, where he studied Politics, Philosophy and Economics; he was taught German history at Oxford by Timothy Mason. He graduated from Oxford with a BA in 1971, then studied history at Yale University, where he was taught by Henry Ashby Turner, obtaining an MA in 1974, MPhil in 1976 and PhD in 1982.

Career
Hayes began his first teaching job at Northwestern in 1980, before completing his PhD, and taught there continuously for 36 years, first as professor of history and German, then from 2000 to 2016 as Theodore Zev Weiss Holocaust Educational Foundation Professor. From 2009 until 2014 he was chair of Northwestern's history department.

His first book, Industry and Ideology: IG Farben in the Nazi Era (1987), a study of the relationship between the Nazi Party and IG Farben, a German chemical company, was awarded the Biennial Book Prize by the Conference Group for Central European History, American Historical Association.

Personal life
Hayes lives in Chicago with his husband, Voltaire Miran, and their standard poodles, Annyong and Maeby.

Selected works
(1986) with Volker Durr and Kathy Harms, eds. Imperial Germany. Madison: University of Wisconsin Press.
(1987). Industry and Ideology: IG Farben in the Nazi Era. Cambridge: Cambridge University Press.
(1991), ed. Lessons and Legacies I: The Meaning of the Holocaust in a Changing World. Evanston, IL: Northwestern University Press.
(1999), ed. Lessons and Legacies III: Memory, Memorialization and Denial. Evanston, IL: Northwestern University Press.
(2004). From Cooperation to Complicity: Degussa in the Third Reich. Cambridge: Cambridge University Press.
(2002) with David Mickenberg and Corinne Granof, eds. The Last Expression: Art and Auschwitz. Block Museum.
(2010) with Eckart Conze, Norbert Frei and Moshe Zimmerman, eds. Das Amt und die Vergangenheit: Deutsche Diplomaten im Dritten Reich und in der Bundesrepublik. Karl Blessing Verlag.
(2010) with John K. Roth, eds. The Oxford Handbook of Holocaust Studies. New York: Oxford University Press.
(2015), ed. How Was It Possible? A Holocaust Reader. Lincoln, NE: University of Nebraska Press.
(2017). Why? Explaining the Holocaust. New York: W. W. Norton & Company.
(2020) with Christopher Browning and Raul Hilberg, "German Rairoads Jewish Souls". New York: Berghahn Books.
(forthcoming) with Stephan Lindner. Profits and Persecution: German Big Business in the Third Reich. Cambridge University Press.

References

External links
 Personal website.
Homepage, Northwestern University.

Hayes, Peter (2013). "From Aryanization to Auschwitz-German Corporate Complicity in the Holocaust", lecture at Oregon State University.

Year of birth missing (living people)
Living people
Alumni of Balliol College, Oxford
21st-century American historians
21st-century American male writers
Bowdoin College alumni
Historians of the Holocaust
Northwestern University faculty
Yale Graduate School of Arts and Sciences alumni
American male non-fiction writers